Melanastia is a monotypic snout moth genus described by George Hampson in 1930. Its only species, Melanastia bicolor, described in the same article, is found in Nigeria and South Africa.

References

Moths described in 1930
Phycitinae
Monotypic moth genera
Moths of Africa